Steele Venters (born May 16, 2001) is an American college basketball player for the Eastern Washington Eagles of the Big Sky Conference.

High school career
Venters grew up in Ellensburg, Washington, the son of Erin and Wade Venters. His father played professional basketball overseas. Venters attended Ellensburg High School. As a senior, he led Ellensburg to a 16–6 record and a Central Washington Athletic Conference title, averaging 23 points, eight rebounds, and five assists per game. Venters was a first team Associated Press 2A All-State selection and scored over 1,200 points in his high school career. He committed to play college basketball at Eastern Washington.

College career
Venters redshirted his freshman season. He averaged 3.6 points, 1.4 rebounds and 0.7 assists per game as a redshirt freshman. As a redshirt sophomore, Venters averaged 16.7 points and 3.9 rebounds per game. He was named to the Second Team All-Big Sky. Venters earned Big Sky Player of the Year honors as a junior.

References

External links
Eastern Washington Eagles bio

2000 births
Living people
American men's basketball players
Basketball players from Washington (state)
Eastern Washington Eagles men's basketball players
People from Ellensburg, Washington
Shooting guards